Capital Power is an independent power generation company based in Edmonton, Alberta, Canada.  Capital Power develops, acquires, owns and operates power generation facilities using a variety of energy sources. Capital Power owns approximately 6,600 megawatts of power generation capacity at 27 facilities across North America.

History
The company history dates back to Edmonton Electric Lighting and Power Company formed in 1891.  Previously named Edmonton Power, then EPCOR Generation (a division of EPCOR Utilities), Capital Power was created through issuance of a 25% IPO by EPCOR Utilities in 2009 and has assets in Alberta, British Columbia, Ontario and the United States.

The decision to split EPCOR Utilities into two separate companies (one publicly owned by the sole shareholder, City of Edmonton) was made at a special meeting of Edmonton City Council held on April 17, 2009.

The creation of Capital Power and the transfer of assets from the City of Edmonton-owned utility EPCOR resulted in debate by local citizens group "Our Power".

As of its initial public offering in 2009, Capital Power L.P. held a 49% voting interest and 100% economic interest in CPI Investments Inc., a holding company owning approximately 29.6% of the limited partnership units of Capital Power Income L.P.(CPILP), and 100% of the shares of the general partner of CPILP. CPILP held ownership interests in 21 power generation assets in Canada and the United States.

On November 7, 2011, Atlantic Power Corporation acquired Capital Power Income L.P (CPILP). As part of the arrangement, Capital Power acquired CPILP's Roxboro and Southport plants in North Carolina.

The Clover Bar Landfill Gas facility was commissioned in 2005. The facility utilizes landfill gas from the City of Edmonton’s Waste Management Centre. Output from the facility is sold to the City of Edmonton.

Capital Power developed and operates the Clover Bar Energy Centre, which features three highly-efficient natural gas turbines.

On October 19, 2010, Capital Power acquired the Island Generation Facility, a 275 megawatt (MW), gas-fired combined cycle power plant at Campbell River, British Columbia, from Kelson Canada Inc. closed on.

On September 1, 2011, Capital Power and TransAlta completed the 495 MW (gross) Keephills 3 generating facility, and announced the commencement of commercial operation at the facility. Capital Power led construction of the facility, and TransAlta, which will operate the plant. The facility is the most technologically advanced coal-fired plant in Canada.

On October 12, 2012, Innergex Renewable Energy Inc. acquired Capital Power's Brown Lake, B.C., and Miller Creek, B.C. hydro facilities.

Capital Power’s 142 MW Quality Wind project, located in British Columbia, began commercial operation on November 6, 2012. Construction of the project was complete on time and under budget.

On November 19, 2013, Emera Inc. acquired Capital Power's facilities in Connecticut: Bridgeport, Rhode Island: Tiverton, and Maine: Rumford, including certain emissions credits. These facilities were subsequently sold by Emera to the Carlyle Group.

On December 6, 2012, Capital Power and ENMAX Corporation announced the signing of a joint venture agreement to build, own and operate the 800 MW Shepard Energy Centre in Calgary.

On March 3, 2017, Capital Power and ENMAX Corporation announced that the Shepard Energy Centre was chosen as the test site for the natural gas track of the $20 million NRG COSIA Carbon XPRIZE, a global competition to develop breakthrough technologies that convert carbon dioxide (CO2) into valuable products. Shepard Energy Centre will host the new Alberta Carbon Conversion Technology Centre, as well as provide the flue gas for testing during the NRG COSIA Carbon XPRIZE and for future innovators. 

On February 21, 2017, Capital Power entered into an agreement to acquire the thermal power business of Veresen Inc., consisting of two gas-fired generation facilities and two waste heat assets.

Capital Power’s Bloom Wind project, located in Kansas began commercial operation on June 1, 2017.

Facilities

Alberta
Clover Bar Energy Centre - Edmonton, AB
Clover Bar Landfill Gas Plant - Edmonton, AB
Enchant Solar facility - Taber, AB
Genesee Generating Station - Warburg, AB
Halkirk Wind - Halkirk, AB
Joffre Cogeneration - Red Deer, AB
Shepard Energy Centre - Calgary, AB

British Columbia
150 Mile House Waste Heat - 150 Mile House, BC
Island Generating - Campbell River, BC
Quality Wind - Tumbler Ridge, BC
Savona Waste heat - Savona, BC

Ontario 
East Windsor Cogeneration Centre - Windsor, ON
Kingsbridge Wind - Goderich, ON
Port Dover and Nanticoke Wind Project - Counties of Haldimand & Norfolk, ON
York Energy Centre - Newmarket, ON

United States
Decatur Energy Center – Decatur, Alabama
Arlington Valley – Phoenix, AZ
Bloom Wind – Counties of Ford & Clark, Kansas
Macho Springs Wind - New Mexico
Roxboro Power Plant - Roxboro, North Carolina
Southport Power Plant - Southport, North Carolina
Beaufort Solar – Chocowinty, North Carolina
New Frontier Wind – McHenry County, North Dakota

Economic interests in facilities
Capital Power has economic interests in the following facilities, which are operated by other entities:
Joffre - Red Deer, AB
Keephills 3 - Wabamun, AB

Projects in development or construction

Genesee 4 & 5

Capital Power is planning to develop the new natural gas-powered Genesee 4 & 5 generating station (formerly Capital Power Energy Centre) in Warburg, Alberta. On December 5, 2013, Capital Power entered into a joint-venture agreement with ENMAX Corporation to develop, construct, own and operate the project, which was renamed to Genesee 4 & 5.

Renewable assets in Canada 
In December 2017, the Whitla Wind project (Medicine Hat, AB) was awarded a 20-year contract by the Alberta Electric System Operator (AESO) in the first round of its Renewable Electricity Program (REP). The wind plant is expected to start commercial operation in the fourth quarter of 2019.

As of February 2019, Capital Power has the following renewables projects in consultation or planning:

 Halkirk 2 Wind – Halkirk, AB

Renewable assets in the United States 
In November 2014, Capital Power acquired 10 wind development sites and four solar sites in the United States through the acquisition of Element Power US, LLC.[20]

As of February 2019, Capital Power has the following renewables projects in consultation or planning:

 Sun Valley Solar – Maricopa County, Arizona
 Hopeful Solar – Mitchell County, Georgia
 Newton Solar – Baker County, Georgia
 Cardinal Point – Counties of McDonough and Warren, Illinois
 Willow Creek Wind – Counties of Cerro Gordo and Hancock, Iowa
 Salt Springs Wind – Counties of Ford and Hodgeman, Kansas
 Green Hills Wind – Sullivan County, Missouri
 Garrison Butte Wind – Mercer County, North Dakota
 Black Fork Wind – Counties of Crawford and Richland, Ohio
 Nolin Hills Wind – Umatilla County, Oregon
 Poplars Ranch Solar – Lake County, Oregon
 Tisch Mills Wind – Counties of Manitowac and Kewaunee, Wisconsin

See also
 EPCOR Utilities Incorporated

References

External links
 Capital Power Corporation website

Electric power companies of Canada
Energy in Alberta
Companies based in Edmonton
Companies formerly owned by municipalities of Canada
Energy companies established in 1970
Non-renewable resource companies established in 1970
Renewable resource companies established in 1970
1970 establishments in Alberta
Companies listed on the Toronto Stock Exchange
Canadian companies established in 1970